Wilfred Davy Smith (April 24, 1881 – September 16, 1942) was a physician and politician in Ontario, Canada. He represented Dufferin—Simcoe in the Legislative Assembly of Ontario from 1934 to 1937 as a Liberal.

The son of William Davy Smith and Henrietta Rinch, both natives of England, he was born in East Oxford township and was educated in Woodstock and at Toronto University, In 1914, Smith married Dorothy Wolsely. He served as chair of the Board of Education for Creemore, Smith was also a Mason.

He died from a coronary thrombosis in Saint John, New Brunswick at the age of 61.

References 

1881 births
1942 deaths
Ontario Liberal Party MPPs